Southern Railway Company Overhead Bridge, also known as North Carolina Bridge #220426, is a historic overhead bridge located at Kings Mountain, Cleveland County, North Carolina.  It was built in 1919, and is a reinforced concrete tee-beam vehicular bridge.  It measures about 80 feet long and 18 feet,  inches, wide and goes over the Norfolk Southern Railway railroad tracks.

It was listed on the National Register of Historic Places in 2007.

References

Kings Mountain, North Carolina
Road bridges on the National Register of Historic Places in North Carolina
Bridges completed in 1919
Buildings and structures in Cleveland County, North Carolina
National Register of Historic Places in Cleveland County, North Carolina
Concrete bridges in the United States